Arun Bose is an Indian film director, screenwriter, editor and producer predominantly working in Malayalam Movies. He made his directorial debut with the Malayalam feature film 'Luca (2019)' starring Tovino Thomas and Ahaana Krishna in 2019. He has also produced, scripted, photographed and directed an experimental Tamil feature film titled ‘Alaiyin Thisai’. His second Malayalam feature film Mindiyum Paranjum  produced by Salim Ahamed has Unni Mukundan and Aparna Balamurali in the lead. Arun Bose is also a visiting faculty at various film and media schools like L.V. Prasad College of Media Studies, Madras Christian College etc.

Personal life 

Arun Bose was born on 21 December 1982 in Muvattupuzha, Kerala as the son of S.R.C.Bose and Rema Bose. He graduated in Computer Science from St.Joseph's Degree College, Hyderabad and later did a Maters of Arts in communication from Madras Christian College, Chennai. Arun is married to Minu Sadasivan and now settled at Kochi, Kerala. During the initial days of his career, he has worked as the program officer of National Folkore Support Centre.

Filmography

References

External links 

1982 births
Living people
People from Muvattupuzha
21st-century Indian film directors
Film directors from Kerala
Film editors from Kerala
Screenwriters from Kerala
Film producers from Kerala
Malayalam film directors
Malayalam film editors
Malayalam film producers
Malayalam screenwriters